Johan Vandewalle (born 15 February 1960) is a Belgian linguist. He teaches at Ghent University and specializes in Turkic languages.

Life
Vandewalle first became interested in Turkish at the age of thirteen, during a family holiday to Turkey.

He initially studied civil engineering and architecture, before deciding to focus on languages.

In 1987, at the age of twenty-six, he won the Polyglot of Flanders/Babel Prize, after demonstrating communicative competence in nineteen languages (Arabic, Azerbaijani, Bashkir, Dutch, English, French, German, Italian, Kyrgyz, Persian, Russian, Swahili, Tajik, Tatar, Turkish, Turkmen, Tuvan, Uyghur, and Uzbek). Seven old languages that he had studied (such as Latin and Old Church Slavonic) were not tested, and he has since gone on to study many more languages.

In 1993, together with his wife, Linda Gezels, he founded Orientaal vzw, a centre dedicated to the teaching of Oriental languages and cultures.

He has been awarded several prizes for his work in relation to the Turkish language, including the Türkçe Öğretiminde Başarı Ödülü in 1990 and the Ali Şir Nevai Türk Diline Hizmet Ödülü in 2005.

References

External links
"Turkic Languages, Multilingualism and Polyglottery", a talk given by Vandewalle at the Polyglot Conference 2017
"Creating and Using Bilingual Texts for Learning a Diversity of Languages", a talk given by Vandewalle at the Polyglot Conference 2018

1960 births
Belgian Arabists
Belgian orientalists
Belgian philologists
Linguists from Belgium
Linguists of Turkic languages
Linguists of Turkish
Living people
Turkologists
Writers from Bruges